Crocodylus halli, also known as Hall's New Guinea crocodile, is a species of crocodile endemic to the island of New Guinea. It is found on the southern half of the island, south of the New Guinea highlands. It is named after Philip M. Hall, a researcher at the University of Florida who performed the initial studies to clarify the species' distinctiveness.

Taxonomy 
The species was formerly considered a distinct population of the closely related New Guinea crocodile (C. novaeguineae), but genetic analysis as well as morphological analysis of its skull structure (namely the postcrania and maxilla) has supported it being classified as its own species. The two species likely diverged within the last 3-8 million years, when the uplift of the New Guinea highlands created a barrier that divided them into separate populations. Despite the common ancestry of the two species, genetic analysis indicates that the New Guinea crocodile may be more closely related to the putative Borneo crocodile (C. raninus) than to Hall's New Guinea crocodile. This may indicate that C. novaeguinae and C. raninus diverged from each other even more recently than their ancestor did from C. halli, or that the specimen used for C. raninus was actually a misidentified C. novaeguinae. It is important to note the C. raninus has never been formerly recognized as a distinct species and no confirmed specimens (living or dead) of the species have ever been collected or directly observed. In fact, the general consensus is that C. raninus may have actually been misidentified C. porosus or Bornean C. siamensis.

Distribution 
The species occurs in swamps, rivers, and lakes in the southern half of New Guinea. It is known to occasionally enter estuaries, such as the Fly River estuary. Variation is known from individuals across the range, with individuals from Lake Murray having a much wider skull than those from the Aramia River.

Behavior 
The species nests during New Guinea's wet season (November - April), in contrast to C. novaeguineae, which nests near the end of the dry season (July - November).

In captivity 
Three captive crocodiles at the St. Augustine Alligator Farm Zoological Park, formerly considered individuals of C. novaeguinae, were actually found to be C. halli while the study was being conducted. These were used to substantiate observed differences between C. halli and C. novaeguinae.

References 

Crocodylidae
Reptiles described in 2019
Crocodilians of New Guinea